Ramin D. Zabih (born November 18, 1963; Alameda County, California) is a Professor of Computer Science at Cornell University and Cornell Tech in Ithaca, New York.

Education and career
Zabih got undergraduate degrees from the Massachusetts Institute of Technology in computer science and mathematics and then graduated from Stanford University with Ph.D. in the same field. Zabih became a faculty member at Cornell University in 1994 and in 2013 joined Cornell Tech. He specializes in computer vision and apps, most of which have to do with medicine. His technology is used by many companies including such as AOL, Google and Microsoft. He also was an Editor-in-Chief of IEEE Transactions on Pattern Analysis and Machine Intelligence from 2009 to 2012.

Recognitions
In 2012, Zabih was elected a fellow of the Association for Computing Machinery "for contributions to discrete optimization in computer vision"

He was named Fellow of the Institute of Electrical and Electronics Engineers (IEEE) in 2013 for contributions to computer vision algorithms.

References

External links

1963 births
Living people
American computer scientists
Massachusetts Institute of Technology School of Science alumni
Stanford University alumni
Cornell University faculty
Cornell Tech faculty
Fellow Members of the IEEE
Fellows of the Association for Computing Machinery
People from Alameda County, California
MIT School of Engineering alumni